Theatrum Mundi (or the Great Theater of the World) is a metaphorical concept developed throughout Western literature and thought, apparent in theories of the world such as  Plato's Allegory of the Cave, and a popular idea in the Baroque Period among certain writers. This metaphysical explanation of the world portrays the world as a theater (apparent in Shakespeare's saying that "all the world's a stage") wherein people are characters and their actions form a drama, with God as the author, specifically for some Christian thinkers. This metaphor can take various forms, some more deterministic than others, and has also been formulated in different fashions, such as the world as chess game by the Persian philosopher Omar Khayyam. In each formulation of the theatrum mundi, though, the world is a sum greater than its parts, where various roles are played by different actors.

History

The world as a stage was expressed among the ancient Greeks, and especially gained popularity among Stoic and Neoplatonist philosophers such as Plotinus in the late antiquity of the Roman Empire. In Neoplatonism, which went on to influence Christianity, the belief of the separate realm of the soul and its transcendence above the instability of worldly affairs influenced philosophers and later, important Christian figures like St. Augustine to view the world as a theatrical spectacle. 

The relation of God to humanity and the world was expressed throughout the Middle Ages. John of Salisbury, a 12th-century theologian especially coined the term theatrum mundi, characterized by commenting that saints "despise the theater of this world from the heights of their virtue". In several chapters of the third book of his Policraticus, a moral encyclopedia, he meditates on the fact that "the life of man on earth is a comedy, where each forgetting his own plays another's role". The comedy takes place on the scene/in the world, while the auditorium is associated to the Christian paradise. Only a few sages, like some Stoic philosophers or the prophets like Abraham or John the Baptist, are able to accept the role given by God. This acceptation allows them to extract themselves from the theatrum mundi, to adopt a celestial position in the auditorium, and to watch and understand the roles played in the comedy.

The metaphor had intercourse with the actual theater, which conversely could be conceived as the world, in microcosm. The idea continued to be expressed throughout the early modern period less as a strictly theological or philosophical metaphor and began inserting itself in various forms of literature and rhetorical expressions, taking on different meanings in different social and political contexts having dramatic overtones. It is possible that it gradually began to lose its religious connotations, and the theatrum mundi took on more of a secular, political aspect. But going back to Plato's emphasis in Laws of a protagonist embodying the ideal political subject by reflecting the ideal plane, this both political and theological formulation of theatrum mundi was eventually propagated by Tertullian to the point where the sociological idea of roles (or an established form of behavior for individuals within society) descends from it as well. Additionally, it was also cultivated by the transition towards new social forms; for instance, the trappings of the feudal monarchy in England was seen as "empty" and "theatrical" because they occurred in the social context of an ascendant capitalism. It was in England, moreover, where the metaphor was the most developed, although it was also refined in Spain.

Transforming with the developments of philosophy and culture, the theatrum mundi became less popular in the 18th and 19th centuries, but more recently reconceptualizations have developed among Situationists and Jean Baudrillard, as well as Brecht, Beckett, and Artaud- connected to the development of the theoretical and artistic frameworks of the  Spectacle, theatre of cruelty, and the simulacrum, emphasizing the reification of the world and its relations.

See also
  The Great Theater of the World (play)

References

Further reading
Quiring, Bjorn. Revisions of the Theatrum Mundi Metaphor in Early Modern England. De Gruyter, 2014.

Literary concepts